The 1984–85 Northern Premier League season was the 17th in the history of the Northern Premier League, a football competition in England.

Overview
The League featured twenty-two clubs.

Team changes
The following club left the League at the end of the previous season:
Barrow promoted to Alliance Premier League

The following club joined the League at the start of the season:
Bangor City relegated from Alliance Premier League

League table

Results

Cup Results
Challenge Cup:

Marine bt. Goole Town

President's Cup:

Rhyl 2–0 Macclesfield Town

Northern Premier League Shield: Between Champions of NPL Premier Division and Winners of the NPL Cup.

Stafford Rangers bt. Marine

End of the season
At the end of the seventeenth season of the Northern Premier League, Stafford Rangers applied to join the Alliance Premier League and were successful.

Promotion and relegation
The following two clubs left the League at the end of the season:
Stafford Rangers promoted to Alliance Premier League
Grantham relegated to Southern League Midland Division

The following two clubs joined the League the following season:
Gateshead relegated from Alliance Premier League
Caernarfon Town promoted from North West Counties League Division One

External links
 Northern Premier League Tables at RSSSF

Northern Premier League seasons
6